Zone Club was a European lifestyle and entertainment channel. It launched in 1998 as Club. It then launched on 1 April 2001 in Poland, and on 13 September 2004 in Hungary.

The Hungarian version was originally 24/7 on the UPC Direct satellite platform, but on cable, it timeshared with TV2's Írisz TV, which was broadcast between 18:00-23:00 CET. On 27 June 2006, as part of Zone Vision's channels rebranded under the "Zone" brand, Club became Zone Club. The channel became 24/7 in Hungary on 1 January 2007, when Írisz TV closed.

The channel focused on six programme categories: style, health, home, travel, food and relationships. It also broadcast dramas and documentaries. It targeted women aged 18 to 39 and was available 24/7 in five languages, reaching 6 million viewers in 22 countries across Europe, the Arab World and Korea. On 27 December 2010 Zone Club in Poland changed its name into Club TV.

The Hungarian version of the channel became timeshared again by 18 April 2011, when Chello Central Europe launched its new kids channel, Megamax, broadcasting between 16:00-22:00 CET. Megamax's broadcast hours were extended to 15 hours (7:00-22:00 CET) in late 2011, leading Zone Club being broadcast at night.

In EMEA, Zone Club closed on 1 April 2010 and was replaced by Fine Living Network. On 1 February 2012, Zone Club closed in Hungary and was completely replaced by Megamax. On 1 August 2012 Chellomedia revealed that all European versions of the Zone Channels would be rebranded into CBS channels. CBS Drama replaced Club TV in Poland on 3 December 2012.

See also 
 Zone Romantica
 Zone Europa
 Zone Reality
 Chello Zone

References

AMC Networks International
Defunct television channels in Hungary
Defunct television channels in the Netherlands
Defunct television channels in Poland
Television channels and stations established in 1998
Television channels and stations disestablished in 2012